Ludovico de Torres may refer to:

Ludovico de Torres (cardinal) (1552-1609), Roman Catholic cardinal
Ludovico de Torres (archbishop) (1533–1583), Roman Catholic archbishop